Schuldt is a surname. Notable people with the surname include:

Ewald Schuldt (1914–1987), German prehistorian 
Jimmy Schuldt (born 1995), American ice hockey player
Travis Schuldt (born 1974), American actor

See also
Schildt